Dinesen is a surname of Danish origin. The name refers to:
Isak Dinesen, pen name of Danish author Karen Blixen (née Karen Dinesen) (1885–1962)
Mille Dinesen (b. 1974), Danish actress
Thomas Dinesen (1892–1970), Danish recipient of the Victoria Cross; brother of Isak Dinesen

Danish-language surnames